William Calcott (born 16 December 1997) is a professional rugby league footballer who plays as a  for Halifax Panthers in the Betfred Championship.

He made his Halifax début in 2017 Super League Qualifiers.

References

External links
Halifax profile

1997 births
Living people
English rugby league players
Halifax R.L.F.C. players
Hunslet R.L.F.C. players
Rochdale Hornets players
Rugby league second-rows
South Wales Scorpions players
Place of birth missing (living people)